Polygonia (from Greek πολύς - polys, "many" and γωνία - gōnia, "angle") is a genus of butterflies with a conspicuous white mark on the underside of each hindwing, hence the common name comma. They also have conspicuous angular notches on the outer edges of their forewings, hence the other common name anglewing butterflies. The related genus Nymphalis also includes some anglewing species; Polygonia is sometimes classified as a subgenus of Nymphalis.

Many members of Polygonia hibernate as adults. 
Species include:
 Polygonia c-album (Linnaeus, 1758) – comma
 Polygonia c-aureum (Linnaeus, 1758) – Asian comma
 Polygonia comma (Harris, 1842) – eastern comma
 Polygonia egea (Cramer, 1775) – southern comma
 Polygonia faunus (Edwards, 1862) – Faunus anglewing, Faunus comma, green comma
 Polygonia g-argenteum Doubleday & Hewitson, 1846 – Mexican anglewing
 Polygonia gigantea (Leech, 1883) – giant comma
 Polygonia gracilis (Grote & Robinson, 1867) – hoary comma
 Polygonia haroldii Dewitz, 1877 – spotless anglewing
 Polygonia interposita (Staudinger, 1881)
 Polygonia interrogationis (Fabricius, 1798) – question mark
 Polygonia oreas (Edwards, 1869) – oreas anglewing, oreas comma, sylvan anglewing
 Polygonia progne (Cramer, 1775) – grey comma, gray comma
 Polygonia satyrus (Edwards, 1869) – satyr anglewing, satyr comma
 Polygonia undina (Grum-Grshimailo, 1890)
 Polygonia zephyrus (Edwards, 1870) – zephyr comma

Notes

References
 Family Nymphalidae. Butterflies of Canada.
 Genus Nymphalis. Zdenek Fric.

Nymphalini
Butterfly genera
Taxa named by Jacob Hübner